"Fortunate" is a 1999 neo soul song. It may also refer to:

People 
 Fortunate Atubiga (born 1950), Ghanaian politician
 Fortunate Chidzivo (born 1987), Zimbabwean long distance runner
 Fortunate Thulare (born 1994), Botswanan footballer

Other uses 
 MSC Fortunate, a cargo ship also known as MV Fortune and MV Hyundai Fortune
 ST Fortunate, a tug
 Camp Fortunate, a Lewis and Clark Expedition campsite in August 1805
 "The Fortunate", a track on the album Cartel by the American rock band Cartel

See also 
 List of people known as the Fortunate